George Wallace was an African-American state senator from Georgia during the Reconstruction Era.  He represented Hancock County, Baldwin County, and Washington County. He was a Republican. On September 12, 1868, the Georgia State Senate voted to exclude members with mixed heritage. The Georgia House had already kicked out their African American members.

During the American Civil War, Wallace was reported to have been a body servant for Captain Howard Tinsley, to have been at Appomatox when Robert E. Lee surrendered,
and to have ridden General Philip Cook's war-horse "Old Whitey" back to family members of its owner.

References

African-American state legislators in Georgia (U.S. state)
Discrimination in the United States
Republican Party Georgia (U.S. state) state senators
Year of birth missing
Place of birth missing
Year of death missing
Place of death missing
African-American politicians during the Reconstruction Era
Original 33